Chã de Igreja is a town in the northern part of the island of Santo Antão, Cape Verde. It is situated near the north coast of the island, in the valley of the river Ribeira da Garça, 19 km northwest of the island capital Porto Novo. In 2010 its population was 672. The nature reserve Cruzinha, which includes the small seaside village Cruzinha da Garça (part of Chã de Igreja), stretches northeast of Chã de Igreja along the coast.

See also
List of cities and towns in Cape Verde

References

Geography of Santo Antão, Cape Verde
Ribeira Grande Municipality
Towns in Cape Verde